Ijaz Faqih (born March 24, 1956, Karachi, Sindh) is a former Pakistani cricketer who played in five Tests and twenty-seven ODIs between 1980 and 1988.

Born to a Konkani family who migrated to Pakistan from the west coast of Maharashtra, Faqih was a relative of the Pakistani Test cricketer Ebbu Ghazali: his mother-in-law was Ghazali's sister.

A middle-order batsman and off-spin bowler, Faqih played first-class cricket for a number of teams in Pakistan from 1973 to 1991. His highest score was 183 in the quarter-final of the Patron's Trophy in February 1978, when he captained Muslim Commercial Bank to a 609-run victory over Water and Power Development Authority; he also took eight wickets. His best bowling figures of 8 for 51 came seven months later in the BCCP Invitation Tournament, when he captained Muslim Commercial Bank to victory over Sind. In 1985–86 he set a Pakistan record by taking 107 wickets in a season; his teams Karachi Whites and Karachi won the Patron's Trophy and Quaid-e-Azam Trophy respectively.

The high point of Faqih's brief Test career was his century in the Fourth Test against India in the 1986–87 series in India. Flown in as a late replacement for Tauseef Ahmed, who was ill, Faqih scored 105 batting at number eight, adding 154 for the seventh wicket with Imran Khan. He won the player of the match award in the drawn match, but was replaced by Tauseef Ahmed for the fifth and final match of the series, which Pakistan won.

References

1956 births
Living people
Ijaz Faqih
Ijaz Faqih
Cricketers at the 1983 Cricket World Cup
Pakistani cricketers
Karachi cricketers
Karachi Blues cricketers
Karachi Whites cricketers
Public Works Department cricketers
Sindh cricketers
Muslim Commercial Bank cricketers
Cricketers from Karachi
Pakistani people of Konkani descent